Dark Eyes is a 1987 Italian and Soviet film. Set in Italy and Russia in the years before the First World War, it tells the story of a married Italian who falls in love with a married Russian woman. Starring Marcello Mastroianni and Yelena Safonova, it received positive reviews from critics.

Plot 
At a table in the empty restaurant of an Italian ship, Romano is sitting drinking. Pavel, a middle-aged Russian on his honeymoon cruise, enters and the two men strike up a conversation. When Romano says he once went to Russia because of a woman, Pavel asks to hear his story.

From a poor family, he qualified as an architect and married a rich woman who inherited a bank. With little to do, on pretence of illness he took a holiday on his own at an expensive spa. There he met Anna, a Russian woman on her own, who told him she was from a poor family and married a rich man for security. After one night together, she left Romano a letter and disappeared back to Russia.

Deciding that he wanted to spend the rest of his life with her, on pretence of exploring business opportunities he travelled to her remote town. While her husband was hosting a reception for the distinguished foreigner, Romano pursued Anna around the outbuildings and caught her in the henhouse. He said, if she promised to wait for him, he would come back to claim her.

Rushing back to Italy, he found that his wife's bank had collapsed and bailiffs were stripping their palatial house, which was up for sale. Holding the letter she had found, she asked if he had a woman in Russia. He said no, and the two were reconciled. Later she inherited an unexpected legacy and was able to resume their opulent lifestyle.

Pavel says his wife had left an unhappy marriage in the provinces and it took a long time to convince her to trust him and marry again. At this point, the ship's cook comes in and curtly orders Romano to lay the tables for lunch. Pavel goes to look for his wife, who is Anna.

Source material 
The film was adapted from (or rather inspired by) four Anton Chekhov's stories, notably The Lady with the Dog, by a Soviet-Italian team that included Alexander Adabashyan, Suso Cecchi d'Amico and Nikita Mikhalkov. The latter directed. The title refers to a famous Russian song.

Cast
 Marcello Mastroianni as Romano Patroni
 Silvana Mangano as Elisa, Romano's wife
 Marthe Keller as Tina, Romano's mistress
 Isabella Rossellini as Claudia, Romano's daughter
 Pina Cei as Elisa's mother
 Yelena Safonova as Anna Sergeyevna, the Governor's wife 
 Innokenti Smoktunovsky as the Governor of Sysoyev 
 Vsevolod Larionov as Pavel Alekseev
 Ari Ramirez

Location
Principal shooting took place at the Montecatini Terme in Tuscany, in the Volga town of Kostroma, and in Leningrad (Vladimir Palace, Peter and Paul Fortress).

Reception

Critical response
Dark Eyes has an approval rating of 100% on review aggregator website Rotten Tomatoes, based on 9 reviews, and an average rating of 7.84/10.

Awards
Mastroianni received the award for Best Actor at the 1987 Cannes Film Festival and was nominated for the Academy Award for Best Actor. Safonova was awarded the David di Donatello as Best Actress. Costume Designer Carlo Diappi was awarded the Ciak d'oro (Golden Ciak).

See also
The Lady with the Dog (1960)

References

External links

1987 films
1987 in the Soviet Union
1987 drama films
1980s Italian-language films
1980s Russian-language films
Films based on short fiction
Films based on works by Anton Chekhov
Films set in Russia
Films set in the Soviet Union
Films shot in Russia
Films directed by Nikita Mikhalkov
Films with screenplays by Suso Cecchi d'Amico
Films scored by Francis Lai
Soviet multilingual films
Italian multilingual films
1987 multilingual films
Soviet drama films
Italian drama films
Films with screenplays by Nikita Mikhalkov
1980s Italian films